Thor Dresler (born 10 March 1979 in Herlev) is a Danish former professional ice hockey player and current ice hockey coach who participated at the 2010 IIHF World Championship as a member of the Denmark National men's ice hockey team.

References

External links

Living people
Danish ice hockey forwards
Herlev Hornets players
Herning Blue Fox players
Hvidovre Ligahockey players
IFK Arboga IK players
Odense Bulldogs players
IF Troja/Ljungby players
1979 births
People from Herlev Municipality
Sportspeople from the Capital Region of Denmark